Dr. Rudolph (Rudolf) Emmerich (29 September 1856– 15 November 1914) was a German bacteriologist noted for his advances against cholera and his co-invention of the first antibiotic drug Pyocyanase with Oscar Löw in 1890s.

Emmerich made experiments on himself by injections of cholera strains and proved that cholera is less virulent when contracted from human to human as opposed to from the ground.
Emmerich was professor Hygiene and Bacteriology at the University of Munich.

References

1852 births
1914 deaths
German bacteriologists